Homeira Qaderi (born 1980) is an Afghan writer, activist and educator. Her name is also written in English as Homeyra.

Biography 
She was born in Kabul, Afghanistan during the Russian occupation to an artist mother and a father who is a high school teacher. Dr. Qaderi's early childhood was spent first sheltering from the Soviets and then from the civil war following the Soviet withdrawal. When the Taliban conquered Herat, Dr. Qaderi was prohibited from attending school and cloistered in her home. As a young adolescent, she found numerous ways to resist the Taliban's draconian edicts against girls and women. From these early beginnings, she became an outspoken advocate for Afghan women's rights and the rule of law, receiving the Malalai Medal for exceptional bravery from Afghanistan's President, Ashraf Ghani.

At the age of 13, after the Taliban took control of the country and girl schools were closed, she secretly began the homeschooling of girls and boys.  After the first publication of a short story by a woman under the Taliban, they made threats on her life. She was taken out of school and told that she could never return.

Dr. Qaderi took refuge in Iran. For seven years, while studying in Iran, Dr. Qaderi served as Director of The Afghan Artists and Cultural Instructors Society, established for Afghan writers living in Iran. In 2003, three of Dr. Qaderi's stories, “Zire Gonbadeh Kabood”, were published in Herat. Dr. Qaderi was the only Afghan woman writer published in Afghanistan that year. In 2003, she received the Sadegh Hedayat Award in Iran for her short story titled, Baz Baaran Agar Mibarid. This was the first prize ever given in Iran to an Afghan.

Alongside these cultural endeavors in Iran, Dr. Qaderi pursued her studies as well. She obtained a Bachelor of Persian Literature from Shaheed Beheshti University (Tehran) in 2005. In 2007, she received her master's degree in Literature from Allame Tabatabaei University (Iran). She studied Persian Language and Literature at the University of Tehran. In 2014, she received a Ph.D. in Persian Literature from Jawaharlal Nehru University in India. Her thesis was titled, “Reflections of War and Emigration in Stories and Novels of Afghanistan.”

In 2011 she began teaching as a professor at Kabul University. Because of the great demand for her literary skills and professional expertise in Persian Literature, she also began teaching at Mash’al, Gharjistan, and Kateb universities. During the same period, she organized and was active in civic movements focused on achieving equal rights for Afghan women.

Dr. Qaderi was named senior advisor to the Minister of Labor, Social Affairs, Martyrs, and Disabled in Afghanistan. Dr. Qaderi served as an advisor to the Ministry of the Department of Labor and Social Affairs, during which time she fought to improve the dire situation of widows and orphans in Afghan society and to establish programs so that they would be able to achieve self-sufficiency.

In 2010 Dr. Qaderi attended a conference in China focusing on alleviating poverty and promoting better conditions for women in Afghanistan where she spoke extensively about the deprivation and oppression of Afghan women. 
In 2011, Dr. Qaderi participated in the second conference in Bonn, Germany, The International Conference on Afghanistan, speaking before the general assembly regarding the plight of Afghan women and their fight for equal rights. 
In 2012, Dr. Qaderi attended the Tokyo Conference, organized by 100 countries and their civic activists. During this conference, as part of the Afghan delegation, she requested that other countries assist the Afghan Government by dedicating their aid to benefit Afghan women.
In 2012, she met with representatives of the Islamic world in Turkey to request implementation of changes in education and the workplace in order to improve the condition of women in the Muslim world. 
In 2012, she also attended talks in Pakistan and in Tajikistan promoting women's participation in government and in decision making roles within Muslim society. 
In 2014, Dr. Qaderi was a panelist for a symposium in Switzerland regarding the working conditions of women in Afghanistan. 
In December 2014, Dr. Qaderi participated in the London Conference on Afghanistan.
In 2015, Dr. Qaderi was invited to attend the International Writing Program at the University of Iowa City. She took part in the International Writing Program at the University of Iowa.

During the 2021 fall of Kabul, she and her son were among the last to gain entrance through a secret gate on the north side of the airport to flee the country.

Selected works 
 Dancing in the Mosque: An Afghan Mother's Letter to Her Son (2020)
Aqlema, a novel (2015)
Reflection of War and Exile in Stories of Afghanistan (2015)
Naqsh-e Shekaar-e Aho, a novel
Painting of A Deer Hunt – A Fable of Women and Men (2010)
Silver Kabul River Girl, a novel (2009)
Noqra, a novel (2009)
100 Years of Story Writing in Afghanistan (2009)
Goshwara-e- Anis, Anish's Earring, a collection of short stories (2008)
Noqre, the girl of Kabul river, a novel (2008)

See also 

 List of Afghan women writers

References 

1979 births
Living people
Afghan women writers
Afghan novelists
Afghan women's rights activists
International Writing Program alumni
Academic staff of Kabul University
People from Kabul
21st-century Afghan writers
21st-century Afghan women writers